Dr. Hayat Al Sindi (born 6 November 1967) is a Saudi Arabian medical scientist and one of the first female members of the Consultative Assembly of Saudi Arabia. She is famous for making major contributions to point-of-care medical testing and biotechnology. She was ranked by Arabian Business as the 19th most influential Arab in the world and the ninth most influential Arab woman. In 2018, she was listed as one of BBC's 100 Women.

Education
Hayat Sindi was born in Mecca, Saudi Arabia. In 1991, she convinced her family to allow her to travel alone to the UK in order to pursue her higher education. After a year spent learning English and studying for her A-levels, she was accepted to King's College London, where she graduated with a degree in pharmacology in 1995.  While at King's College, she was a recipient of Princess Anne's Award for her undergraduate work on allergy. 

Sindi, who wears the traditional Muslim headscarf, was pressured to abandon her religious and cultural beliefs while at university; she persisted, holding the view that a person's religion, color, or gender has no bearing on scientific contributions. Sindi went on to get a Ph.D. in biotechnology from Newnham College, Cambridge in 2001; she was the first Saudi woman to be accepted at Cambridge University in the field of biotechnology, and the first woman from any of the Arab States of the Persian Gulf to complete a doctoral degree in the field.

Career
Hayat Sindi is a visiting scholar at Harvard University; as such, she travels often between Jeddah, Boston and Cambridge, Massachusetts. Sindi's laboratory work at Harvard earned her a spot with four other scientists in a documentary film supported by the Executive Office of the President of the United States in order to promote science education among young people. Along with her scientific activities, Sindi participated in numerous events aimed at raising the awareness of science among females, particularly in Saudi Arabia and the Muslim World in general. She is also interested in the problem of brain drain, and was an invited speaker at the Jeddah Economic Forum 2005.

Hayat Sindi was a major influence in starting three companies, either as cofounder or founder, Diagnostics for All (DFA), Sonoptix, and i2 (the Institute for imagination and Ingenuity). Her entrepreneurial philosophy is simple: “A true scientist should focus on affordable simple solutions to reach everyone in the world.”

In 2010, Sindi was the winner of the Mekkah Al Mukaramah prize for scientific innovation, given by HRH Prince Khalid bin Faisal Al Saud. She was also named a 2011 Emerging Explorer by the National Geographic Society.

On October 1, 2012, Sindi was appointed by UNESCO head Irina Bokova as a UNESCO Goodwill Ambassador for her efforts in promoting science education in the Middle East, especially for girls. She was also on Newsweek's list of 150 women who shook the world for that year.

In January 2013, Sindi again broke new ground by becoming part of the first group of women to serve in Saudi Arabia's Consultative Council.

In the annual meeting of Clinton Global Initiative held on September 21–24, 2014, Dr. Sindi was awarded the 'Leadership in Civil Society' prize.

References

Further reading

External links

 Profile for Hayat Sindi at Pop Tech
 i2institute, Sindi's company

1967 births
Living people
Alumni of King's College London
Alumni of Newnham College, Cambridge
Members of the Consultative Assembly of Saudi Arabia
Saudi Arabian women in politics
21st-century women politicians
Saudi Arabian pharmacologists
Saudi Arabian Sunni Muslims
Saudi Arabian women
People from Mecca
UNESCO Goodwill Ambassadors
BBC 100 Women
Arab people of Sindhi descent